Robert Gant (born Robert John Gonzalez; July 13, 1968) is an American actor. He is best known for his role as Ben Bruckner on the Showtime series Queer as Folk.

Early life and education
At age ten, Gant began acting in television commercials in Florida and became a member of the Screen Actors Guild at the age of eleven.

Gant studied tap and jazz dance with the American Musical Theatre Company in Tampa, Florida. He performed a soft-shoe routine at MacDill Air Force Base with comedian Bob Hope as part of Hope's USO tour. He attended George D. Chamberlain High School and graduated in 1986.

While attending the University of Pennsylvania, Gant majored in English literature with both Shakespeare and poetry concentrations. He attended the Georgetown University Law Center, where he obtained his Juris Doctor in 1993. Gant was also a member of the Georgetown Gilbert & Sullivan Society, performing in a number of its productions. Gant started a six-man a cappella group, The MetroGnomes, which performed in venues around Washington, D.C.

Gant accepted a position with the Los Angeles office of Chicago-headquartered international law firm Baker McKenzie. When the firm closed its Los Angeles office shortly thereafter, Gant decided to pursue acting and performing.

Career
From 2002 to 2005, Gant portrayed Professor Ben Bruckner in Showtime's television series Queer as Folk. His character was married in the first legal gay marriage portrayed on American television.

In 2004, Gant starred in the short film Billy's Dad is a Fudgepacker, an homage to 1950s educational films, which premiered at the Sundance Film Festival. In 2005, Gant was a series regular in the BBC 3-produced drama Personal Affairs, set in London's financial sector and filmed on location in both London and Scotland. Gant was the sole American in an otherwise all-British cast. 

Gant was a producing partner in the production company Mythgarden. Its 2007 feature film Save Me, a drama set against the backdrop of an ex-gay ministry, stars Gant along with Judith Light and Chad Allen and premiered at the Sundance Film Festival. He also co-produced, co-wrote, and starred in the Netflix-distributed period drama Milada, the true story of Czech politician Milada Horáková, who was executed by the Communist government in 1950.

Gant portrayed television's first gay spy in the film, Kiss Me Deadly, which was shot on location in New Zealand. Gant has portrayed Melissa Benoist's Kryptonian father Zor-El on Supergirl, Todd Crimsen on the Netflix series 13 Reasons Why, and Jim Hunter on The Fosters and its spin-off series Good Trouble. Prior to Queer as Folk, Gant recurred as Principal Calvin Krupps in Ryan Murphy's first television series, Popular, and a recurring role as Caroline's boyfriend Trevor in Caroline in the City.

Gant has had guest roles on the television show Friends, where he played one of two men Phoebe was dating simultaneously. The other man Phoebe dates was played by recurring Queer as Folk actor, Matt Battaglia. Gant guest starred in Melrose Place, Becker, several CSI-related shows, Caroline in the City, and Criminal Minds. In 2013, he portrayed Captain Robert Norton in Dead Space 3, the third installment in the Dead Space video game series released by Electronic Arts.

Personal life
In an interview published by The Advocate magazine, Gant came out as gay in 2002.

Gant supports such organizations as Services & Advocacy for LGBT Elders (SAGE) and Gay & Lesbian Elder Housing (GLEH).

Partial filmography

Film

Television

Stage

References

External links
 

1968 births
20th-century American male actors
21st-century American male actors
American male film actors
American male soap opera actors
American male stage actors
American male television actors
Georgetown University Law Center alumni
Hispanic and Latino American male actors
American gay actors
LGBT Hispanic and Latino American people
American LGBT rights activists
LGBT people from Florida
Living people
Male actors from Tampa, Florida
University of Pennsylvania alumni